The German Parliamentary Committee investigation of the NSA spying scandal (official title: 1. Untersuchungsausschuss „NSA“) was started on March 20, 2014, by the German Parliament in order to investigate the extent and background of foreign secret services spying in Germany in the light of the Global surveillance disclosures (2013–present).
The Committee is also in search of strategies on how to protect telecommunication with technical means.

Members 
The committee is formed by eight members of the German Parliament. The parliamentarian of the Christian Democratic Union (CDU) Clemens Binninger was head of the committee but stepped down after six days. In a statement, Binninger clarified that the other committee members had insisted on inviting Edward Snowden to testify; Binninger objected to this and resigned in protest. Patrick Sensburg (CDU) succeeded him.

Witnesses

Discussion about the witness Snowden 
On May 8, 2014, the committee unanimously decided to let US whistleblower Edward Snowden testify as a witness.

On September 23, 2014, the Green Party and The Left filed a constitutional complaint against the Christian Democratic Union, the Social Democrats and the NSA Parliamentary Committee because of the Christian Democrats' and the Social Democrats' refusal to let the witness Edward Snowden testify in Berlin. The accused proposed a video conference from Moscow which Snowden had refused.

On September 28, 2014, the Green Party and The Left filed a constitutional complaint against German chancellor Merkel. According to them, she refuses to comply with her duty according to Chapter 44 of the German constitution to ensure a real investigation; especially by refusing to ensure the legal requirements to allow the witness Edward Snowden to testify.

Testimony of Binney and Drake 
On July 3, 2014, the former Technical Director of the NSA,  William Binney, who had become a whistleblower after the terrorist attacks of September 11, 2001, testified to the committee. He said that the NSA has a totalitarian approach that has previously only been known from dictatorships and that there is no longer such a thing as privacy. Former NSA employee Thomas Andrews Drake described the close cooperation between the NSA and the German foreign intelligence service BND.

Failed testimony of Greenwald 
The US journalist Glenn Greenwald was asked to testify in September, 2014. On August 1, 2014, he wrote in a letter that he was willing to support the Parliament's investigation on the espionage in Germany by the NSA. By their refusal to let the crucial witness Edward Snowden testify, German politicians had however shown that it is more important to them not to annoy the US than to really investigate and he was not willing to take part in a "ritual" that "shall seem like an investigation".

Operation Eikonal selectors
In Operation Eikonal German BND agents received "Selector Lists" from the NSA − search terms for their dragnet surveillance. They contain IP addresses, mobile phone numbers and email accounts with the BND surveillance system containing hundreds of thousands and possibly more than a million such targets. These lists have been subject of controversy as in 2008 it was revealed that they contained some terms targeting the European Aeronautic Defence and Space Company (EADS), the Eurocopter project as well as French administration, which were first noticed by BND employees in 2005. Other selectors were found to target the administration of Austria. After the revelations made by whistleblower Edward Snowden the BND decided to investigate the issue whose October 2013 conclusion was that at least 2,000 of these selectors were aimed at Western European or even German interests which has been a violation of the Memorandum of Agreement that the US and Germany signed in 2002 in the wake of the 9/11 terror attacks. After reports emerged in 2014 that EADS and Eurocopter had been surveillance targets the Left Party and the Greens filed an official request to obtain evidence of the violations.

The investigative Parliamentary Committee was set up in spring 2014 and reviewed the selectors and discovered 40,000 suspicious search parameters, including espionage targets in Western European governments and numerous companies. The group also confirmed suspicions that the NSA had systematically violated German interests and concluded that the Americans could have perpetrated economic espionage directly under the Germans' noses. The investigative parliamentary committee was not granted access to the NSA's selectors list as an appeal led by opposition politicians failed at Germany's top court - instead the ruling coalition appointed an administrative judge, Kurt Graulich, as a "person of trust" who was granted access to the list and briefed the investigative commission on its contents after analyzing the 40,000 parameters. In his almost 300-paged report Graulich concluded that European government agencies were targeted massively and that Americans hence broke contractual agreements. He also found that German targets which received special protection from surveillance of domestic intelligence agencies by Germany's Basic Law (Grundgesetz) − including numerous enterprises based in Germany − were featured in the NSA's wishlist in a surprising plenitude. While the magnitude differs there have also been problematic BND-internal selectors which have been used until end of 2013 - around two thirds of 3300 targets were related to EU and NATO states. Klaus Landefeld, member of the board at the Internet industry association Eco International, has met intelligence officials and legislators to present suggestions for improvement, like streamlining the selector system.

Spying on the committee 
On July 4, 2014, it was revealed to the public that BND agent Markus R. had been arrested on July 2, 2014, for apparently having spied. The 31-year-old German is accused of having worked for the CIA. After his arrest, the US ambassador John B. Emerson was summoned for talks at the German Foreign Office.

It was revealed that the BND-agent had saved 218 secret BND documents on USB sticks since 2012 and sold them to US agents for a sum of 25,000 Euro in Salzburg, Austria. At least three of the documents were about the NSA Parliamentary Committee.
The Federal Office for the Protection of the Constitution had mistaken him for a Russian spy and asked US colleagues to help uncover him.

On July 9, 2014, a second US spy was discovered, who worked for the Secretary of Defense.

In July 2014 a Parliament technician found out that the mobile phone of Roderich Kiesewetter, representative of the Christian Democratic Union in the committee, was spied on. Kiesewetter said there is evidence that all four Party representatives in the committee have been spied on.

Document leaks 
In the months following May 2015, Peter Pilz, a member of the Austrian parliament for the Green Party, disclosed several documents and transcripts related to operation Eikonal, in which NSA and BND cooperated for tapping transit cables at a facility of Deutsche Telekom in Frankfurt. These documents were highly sensitive and handed over to the committee for investigating the Eikonal operation. Therefore, it seems likely someone from the committee leaked these documents to Pilz. Among them are lists of communication channels from many European countries, including most of Germany's neighbours. Peter Pilz also discovered NSA spying facilities in Austria, and therefore wants a parliamentary committee on the NSA spying in his own country too.

On December 1, 2016, WikiLeaks released over 2,400 documents which it claims are from the investigation.

See also 
 Dropmire
 PRISM (surveillance program)
 Spying on United Nations leaders by United States diplomats

References

External links 
 German homepage of the Parliamentary Investigative Committee
 Introduction and translations of the Committee hearings in English, Part I - Part II - Part III
 The NSA in Germany: Snowden's Documents Available for Download
 How the German Foreign Intelligence Agency BND tapped the Internet Exchange Point DE-CIX in Frankfurt, since 2009

Internet censorship
Information privacy
Global surveillance
Bundestag
National Security Agency
Surveillance scandals